Jero Shakpoke (born 5 December 1979) is a Nigerian former professional footballer who played as a defender. Between 1998 and 1999, he made six appearances for the Nigeria national team.

Career
Shakpoke was born in Warri, Nigeria.

He joined Tuscan Serie A side A.C. Siena in August 2009 from Rovigo Calcio on a two-year permanent deal. According to an interview released by Shakpoke himself, he will successively leave Siena to join an unnamed Belgian team within days; the team was later unveiled to be Royale Union Saint-Gilloise, headed by Italian Roberto Landi, on a season loan move.

References

External links
 
 Profile - Union St Gilloise 

1979 births
Living people
Sportspeople from Warri
Association football defenders
Nigerian footballers
Nigeria international footballers
Ligue 2 players
Serie B players
Sharks F.C. players
FK Vardar players
HNK Rijeka players
Zagłębie Lubin players
A.C. Reggiana 1919 players
FC Lugano players
OGC Nice players
Palermo F.C. players
S.S. Teramo Calcio players
S.S.D. Varese Calcio players
Rovigo Calcio players
A.C.N. Siena 1904 players
Royale Union Saint-Gilloise players
Nigerian expatriate footballers
Nigerian expatriate sportspeople in Poland
Nigerian expatriate sportspeople in Italy
Nigerian expatriate sportspeople in Switzerland
Nigerian expatriate sportspeople in France
Nigerian expatriate sportspeople in Belgium
Expatriate footballers in North Macedonia
Expatriate footballers in Croatia
Expatriate footballers in Poland
Expatriate footballers in Italy
Expatriate footballers in Switzerland
Expatriate footballers in France